The Sidna Omar Mosque is a Mamluk-era mosque in the Jewish Quarter of the Old City of Jerusalem. It stands adjacent to the Hurva and Ramban Synagogues. 

After Israel captured East Jerusalem, including the Old City of Jerusalem, in the Six-Day War, the mosque was closed, and has been closed ever since.

History

The earliest reference know to the mosque was made by historian Mujir al-Din (born in 1496), who mentions the mosque was renovated in 1397, with funds collected and land donated to maintain it. Obadiah Bartenura wrote that the mosque was built by a Jew who had converted to Islam.

In the Six-Day War, the minaret was hit by snipers and was renovated in 1974.

Further renovations to the building were done in 2019, paid for by the government of Jordan.

Description
The minaret is typical of the Mamluk period. It rises two stories high and is topped by a balcony for the muezzin. The upper part of the minaret is narrower than its base in order to stabilize the structure.

Archaeology
Some columns found inside the mosque have led to it being associated with the Crusader Church of St Martin in the late nineteenth century; according to Burgoyne since the columns are in their secondary use "this tenuous link between the mosque and the church cannot be maintained."

References

Mosques in Jerusalem
Mamluk architecture